Saint Mary's Battery, also known as Qolla s-Safra Battery or Gironda Battery, was an artillery battery in Marsalforn, limits of Żebbuġ, Gozo, Malta. It was built by the Order of Saint John in 1715 as one of a series of coastal fortifications around the Maltese Islands.

The battery formed part of a chain of fortifications built to defend Marsalforn and nearby bays from Ottoman or Barbary attacks. Although the area was fortified by a number of towers, batteries, redoubts and entrenchments, all of these have been destroyed except for Qolla l-Bajda Battery between Qbajjar and Xwejni Bays.

The battery consisted of a semi-circular gun platform ringed by a parapet, and two blockhouses joined together by a wall. It has been demolished and no remains can be seen.

References

Batteries in Malta
Hospitaller fortifications in Malta
Military installations established in 1715
Demolished buildings and structures in Malta
Żebbuġ, Gozo
Limestone buildings in Malta
18th-century fortifications
1715 establishments in Malta
18th Century military history of Malta